Federico  Caballero is a Filipino chanter of Philippine epic poetry. Caballero is a recipient of the National Living Treasures Award.

Early life
Born on December 25, 1938, Caballero is of the Panay-Bukidnon people from the Central Panay mountains.

Work
He is known for his work on the documentation of the oral literature, particularly the ten epics. These epics are rendered in an extinct language related to Kinaray-a.

Caballero, who is also called Nong Pedring, learned about epics from his mother and his grandmother, Anggoy Omil who would chant these to him and his siblings as a lullaby. When Anggoy and his mother died, he went on to continue the traditions and documented these epics which are referred to as the Labaw Dunggon and Humadapnon epics with researchers. He worked with the Bureau of Nonformal Education, to teach people how to read and write and would promote the tradition of epic chanting despite the initial objection of his children.

He also worked as the manughusay in his local community, an arbiter who helps resolves disputes and conflicts in the community. He is considered as a bantugan due to his positive influence extending beyond his community.

The National Commission for Culture and the Arts recognized him as a National Living Treasure in the year 2000 for "weaving the fabric of oral tradition".

Personal life
Caballero is married to Lucia (who is a binukot, a title similar to a princess in Panay-Bukidnon tradition) and has three children.

References

1938 births
Living people
National Living Treasures of the Philippines
20th-century Filipino male singers
Filipino folk singers